Established in 2008, the Lichter Filmfest Frankfurt International is a film festival taking place in Frankfurt, Germany and the Rhine-Main region every year in spring. Aside from regional film productions in competition for Best Short and Feature Film, the festival also presents international films, VR film productions and video art.

History 

Under the name of Lichter Filmtage Frankfurt/Rhein-Main, the festival now known as Lichter Filmfest Frankfurt International was initiated by festival director Gregor Maria Schubert in 2008. The festival was founded by Gregor Maria Schubert, Stephan Limbach, Mark Liedtke, Alexander Dumitran, and Cordula Mack. The festival was founded by Gregor Maria Schubert, Stephan Limbach, Mark Liedtke, Alexander Dumitran, and Cordula Mack. Currently, it is headed by Gregor Maria Schubert and Johanna Süss, supported by a team of volunteers.

The festival made its debut as a show for regional film productions. In the years to follow it developed into a show featuring international productions as well as a film competition. The festival changed its location from the former AtelierFrankfurt near the Frankfurt main station to the former cinema Frankfurter Turmpalast in the inner-city of Frankfurt. The attendance increased from 3,300 visitors in 2008 to 12,000 visitors in 2015. So during the festival and beyond, LICHTER plays films and other events at vacant buildings in the city, such as the former diamond exchange or the office building VAU. The Lichter Art Award (founded in 2008 under the name "Kunstlichter," curated by Saul Judd) awards a prize for video art. In the festival center, installations and panel shows present new perspectives and approach the featured topic from a theoretical standpoint.

In 2012, Lichter Filmfest Frankfurt International was distinguished as a "motion sensor" (Bewegungsmelder) by the Federal Government's "Initiative Kultur- und Kreativwirtschaft." In 2013, the festival took place under the patronage of Volker Schlöndorff, in 2014 under the patronage of Leander Haußmann and in 2016 under the patronage of Edgar Reitz. Since 2014, in cooperation with the hessische Film- und Medienakademie and under the direction of Bert Rebhandl, the "Lichter Kritikerblog" offers students the opportunity to discuss the medium of film journalistically. On the initiative of Edgar Reitz, a conference addressed the future of German cinema. Approximately 100 filmmakers developed a concept which recommends pivotal changes in funding and financing, education, distribution and cinema culture – the Frankfurt Positions on the Future of German Cinema.

The festival is financed by public grants, donations and sponsors. In the years 2012, 2016, 2017 and 2018 the festival even used crowdfunding.

Beyond the festival week, the Lichter Filmkultur e.V. hosts the "Frankfurter Sequenzen", "essenkochenfilme" and a movie picnic at the Schwanheim ferry terminal in Höchst. Since 2014, the association hosts the „Freiluftkino Frankfurt“. Additionally, in 2019, the „Sommerkino im Altwerk“ in Rüsselsheim was founded and in 2022 the first edition of "High Rice Cinema" took place.

Program 
Beyond the regional film competition, the festival presents an international film program. Since 2012 this program addresses a certain thematic focal point. In 2013, the key theme was "City", while in 2014 the films addressed the topic "Humor, comicality, and comedy." In 2015, the festival presented films from around the world focusing on "Money" and in 2016 on "Frontiers". In 2017, the international program was focused on the theme of "Truth", in 2018 everything revolved around "Chaos" and in 2019 "Nature" was the main theme for the international program. In 2020 and 2021 the main themes were "Power" and "Change, respectively. In 2022, the festival will revolve around "Freedom".

In addition to the film screenings, the program includes discussion panels and talk shows for the filmmakers of the Rhine Main Area. Aside from film screenings, the year-round events include concerts and talk shows and discussion forums. In addition, the Lichter Filmfest regularly guest in the cinemas both of the region and of Frankfurt's twin cities.

Sections 
 International films (key theme)
 Regional Competition (short film, feature film)
 Films out of competition (short film, feature film)
 VR Storytelling Competition (international competition)
 Thematic accompanying program (Lectures, Panels, business talk)
 Lichter Art Award (International competition and exhibition)

Congress “Zukunft Deutscher Film” 

In April 2018, around 100 filmmakers came together during the LICHTER Filmfest in Frankfurt. Moved by their belief in cinema, the directors, producers, cinema and festival organizers, sponsors, distribution executives, actors and critics worked on a conceptual changes for the funding and financing, training and film education, distribution and cinema culture that could enliven German film: the “Frankfurter Positionen”.

One year after starting the “Frankfurter Positionen”, they still made for many discussions. A debate on the future of German film funding followed at the Berlinale. During the 12th LICHTER Filmfest, a day of talks between representatives from politics took place. In the wake of Lichter-On-Demand in the year 2020, the festival initiated a podcast series dealing with the results of right-wing populism and the Corona pandemic on the film sector. This series was continued in the wake of the second On-Demand festival edition in 2021 with an english-language panel on the future of film culture.

The second congress "Zukunft Deutscher Film" (Future of German Film) was planned with the addition of the title "Forum Europa" from the 1 to 3 December 2021 in several of Frankfurts museums and cultural institutions. In cooperation with FERA, the European association representing the interests of film and television directors, guests from numerous European countries were invited, including the Greek-French director Costa-Gavras. Due to the pandemic, the congress had to be postponed at short notice. 

In preparation for the second congress, the publication "Das andere Kino" (The Other Cinema) was published in December 2021, dealing with the future of cinema in various texts - by Edgar Reitz, Daniela Kloock, Rüdiger Suchsland, Vinzenz Hediger and Nathalie Bredella, among others.

Attendances 
Starting out with an improvised cinema and 3,300 visitors in its first year, the Lichter Filmfest has evolved into a festival with more than one hundred films and events and 13,000 visitors in 2016.

Awards and Laureates 
The diverse film culture in Hessen and the Rhine-Main region is being lauded with the Regional Feature Film and Short Film awards. Since 2011, the Lichter Art Award honors contemporary video art from all around the world. In the internationally advertised VR Storytelling Award, the festival organisers have been searching for extraordinary virtual reality films since 2017.

The winners are awarded the "Lichter-Bembel," a typical Frankfurt earthenware apple wine pitcher. The Best Regional Feature Film Award, sponsored bei Dr. Marschner Stiftung, is endowed with €3,000. For the Best Regional Short, the Lichter Art Award and the VR Storytelling Award, €1,000 are awarded in cash. In addition, the Binding Audience Award with a prize money of €2,000 is awarded. From 2016 to 2018, the festival also honored the best contribution to the International Program with the International Feature Award, which included €1,500.

2008
Regional Feature Film:  by Daniel Acht and Ali Eckert
Regional Short Film: Der Jäger und der Bär by Joachim Brandenberg
2009
Regional Feature Film: Endstation der Sehnsüchte by Sung-Hyung Cho
Regional Short FIlm: Adamsapfel by Johannes Baptista Ludwig and Sascha Geerdts
2010
Regional Feature Film: Das Schreiben & das Schweigen by Carmen Tartarotti
Regional Short Film: T.R.A. by Eva Becker
Special reference of the jury: Marivanna by Olga Petrova and Riverrun & Touchdown by Gunter Deller
2011
Regional Feature Film: Im Alter von Ellen by Pia Marais
Regional Short Film: N Gschichtn by Eva Becker
Laudatory reference of the jury: Die Allerletzten by Otmar Hitzelberger
LICHTER Art Award: Caja Tarro Silla Marco by Luciana Lamothe

2012
Feature Film: Babycall by Pål Sletaune
Short Film: Die alte Frau by Ariane Mayer
LICHTER Art Award: Dear What's Your Face by Oliver Husain
LICHTER Art Award: Sent på Jorden by John Skoog
2013
Regional Feature Film: Im Land dazwischen by Melanie Gärtner
Regional Short Film: Misguided by Lukas Rinker
Audience Award: Die Meta-Morphose. Leicht verstimmt ins Rampenlicht by Daniel Siebert
Laudatory reference of the jury: Wildwechsel by Gunter Deller
2014
Regional Feature Film: Erhobenen Hauptes by DocView
Regional Short Film: Bahar im Wunderland by Behrooz Karamizade and RE50 Richtung Wächtersbach by Leslie Bauer
Audience Award: The Scrapbox by Daniel Herzog (director) and Robin Wissel (creative leader)
Laudatory reference of the jury: Meine Beschneidung by Arne Ahrens, Peter Rist - Idealist by Michael Schwarz, and Qasbegi by Michel Klöfkorn
LICHTER Art Award: Unmanned Distances by Bertrand Flanet
2015
Regional Feature Film: Sin & Illy still alive by Maria Hengge and Conduct! Jede Bewegung zählt by Götz Schauder
Regional Short Film: Ein bisschen Normalität by Michael Schaff and Thomas Toth
Audience Award: Carlo, Keep Swingin’ by Elizabeth Ok
LICHTER Courage Award: X-X-XX—X—Gewobenes Papier by Michel Klöfkorn
Laudatory reference of the jury: Gezeitentümpel by Pablo Zinser, and Warum ist der Tisch schräg!/Warum mag jeder Geld! by Stefan Vogt
LICHTER Art Award: The Second of August by Jonathan Van Essche
2016
Regional Feature Film: Meine Brüder und Schwestern im Norden by Sung-Hyung Cho
Regional Short Film: In the Distance by Florian Grolig
International Feature Award: Les Sauteurs by Abou Bakar Sidibé, Estephan Wagner, and Moritz Siebert and Masaan by Neeraj Ghaywan
Audience Award Feature Film: Auf einer Skala von 1–10 by Katharina Uhland
Audience Award Short Film: In the Distance by Florian Grolig and The Old Man and the Bird by Dennis Stein-Schomburg
Laudatory reference of the jury: Der Langstreckenläufer by Zuniel Kim
LICHTER Art Award: B-Roll with Andre by James N. Kienitz Wilkins
2017
Regional Feature Film: A Gravame – das Stahlwerk, der Tod, Maria und die Mütter von Tamburi by Peter Rippl
Regional Short Film: Über Druck by Sebastian Binder and Fred Schirmer
International Feature Award: I am not Madame Bovary by Feng Xiaogang
Audience Award Feature Film: Ghostland by Simon Stadler und Catenia Lermer
LICHTER Art Award: Simba in New York by Tobi Sauer
VR Storytelling Award: Sergeant James by Alexandre Perez
2018
Regional Feature Film: Männerfreundschaften by Rosa von Praunheim
Regional Short Film: Horizont by Peter Meister
International Feature Award: Blue My Mind by Lisa Brühlmann
Audience Award Feature Film: Women of the Venezuelan Chaos by Margarita Cadenas
LICHTER Art Award: Waiting for Record by Jakob Engel
VR Storytelling Award: I, Philip by Pierre Zandrowicz

2019
Regional Feature Film: Khrustal by Darya Zhuk
Regional Short Film: We will survive by Nele Dehnenkamp
Audience Award Feature Film: The Watson's Hotel by Peter Rippl, Ragunath Vasudevan und Nathaniel Knop
LICHTER Art Award: WEIGHT by Andrew de Freitas
Virtual Reality Storytelling Award: The Real Thing by Benoit Felici
2020
Regional Feature Film: LIVE by Lisa Charlotte Friederich
Regional Short Film: Nachtschicht by David Dybeck
Audience Award Short Film: Die Vergänglichkeit des Bernd Hasselhuhn by Max Rainer
LICHTER Art Award: Fossil Place by Florencia Levy
VR Storytelling Award: Aripi by Dmitri Voloshin
2021
 Regional Feature Film: street line von Justin Peach und Lisa Engelbach
 Regional Short Film: MILK von Jennifer Kolbe
 LICHTER Art Award: MOTOR von der Frankfurter Hauptschule
 Special mention from the jury: Trübe Wolken von Glenn Büsing und Christian Schäfer
 LICHTER VR Storytelling Award: Replacements – Penggantian von Jonathan Hagard
2022
 Regional Feature Film: Als Susan Sontag im Publikum saß von RP Kahl
 Regional Short Film: 21:71 Uhr von Joey Arand
 LICHTER Art Award: Soum von Alice Brygo
 LICHTER VR Storytelling Award: Lockdown Dreamscape VR von Nicolas Gebbe
 Audience Award: On the Other Side (Del Otro Lado) von Iván Guarnizo

Juries 
A jury of filmmakers and film experts decides on the winners of the regional categories "Best Feature Film" and "Best Short Film." Since 2016 there is also the category "Best International Feature." Former jury members:
2008
Birgit Lehmann (director), Bahman Kormi (cinematogropher), Sebastian Popp (film producer)
2009
Rudolf Worschech (film editor), Rembert Hüser (film scholar), Martina Elbert (director)
2010
Astrid Rieger (director), Christiane von Wahlert (managing director Freiwillige Selbstkontrolle der Filmwirtschaft), Michael Wiedemann (department head at Film- und Medienstiftung NRW and head of Kinofests Lünen)
2011
Maryam Zaree (actress), Cyril Tuschi (director), Daniel Kothenschulte (film critic)
LICHTER Art Award: Judith Hopf, Saul Judd, Matthias Ulrich
2012
Bettina Buchler (acting director Filmbewertungsstelle), Peter Dörfler (director), Anke Sevenich (actress)
LICHTER Art Award: Mike Bouchet, Saul Judd, Sophie von Olfers
2013
Pia Marais (director), Florian Koerner von Gustorf (film producer), Matthias Luthardt (director)
LICHTER Art Award: Saul Judd, Felix Ruhöfer, Simon Starling
2014
Regional Feature Film: Hans Robert Eisenhauer (film producer), Jakob Preuss (documentary filmmaker), Gaby Babic (director of "goEast – Festival des mittel- und osteuropäischen Films")
Regional Short Film: Toby Ashraf (film journalist), Oona Lea von Maydell (actress), Tidi von Tiedemann (producer)
LICHTER Art Award: Peter Gorschlüter, Karola Gramann, Saul Judd
2015
Regional Feature Film: Christoph Thoke (film producer), Tatjana Turanskyj (director, film producer, screenwriter and actress), Anne Ratte-Polle (actress)
Regional Short Film: Martina Valentina Baumgartner (film producer), Stefan Kriekhaus (screenwriter), Achim Forst (film editor)
LICHTER Art Award: Katharina Dohm, Saul Judd, Tasja Langenbach
2016
Regional Short Film: Isabel Berghout, Lili Kobbe, Hendrik Schmitt
Regional Feature Film: Stipe Erceg, Linda Söffker, Nico Sommer
International Feature Award: Max Linz, Barbara Schweizerhof, Hermann Vaske
LICHTER Art Award: Saul Judd, Fabian Schöneich, Vivian Trommer
2017
Regional Short Film: Robert Hertel (film producer), Sylve Hohlbaum (director), Christel Schmidt (film editor)
Regional Feature Film: Numan Acar (actor), Reza Brojerdi (actor and film producer), Pepe Danquart (film director), Mischka Popp (film director)
International Feature Award: Niko Apel (film director), Nicole Baum (film editor), Betty Berr und Rainer Wothe (festival directors)
LICHTER Art Award: Saul Judd, Olaf Stüber, Mathilde Ter Heijne
VR Storytelling Award: Astrid Kahmke, Eckart Köberich, Kay Meseberg, Marco Heutink, Ralph Benz
2018
Regional Short Film: Andreas Heidenreich, Lilo Mangelsdorff, Peter Rippl
Regional Feature Film: Uwe B. Carstensen, Carolin Weidner, Julia Zange
International Feature Award: Giacomo Abbruzzese, Uri Aviv, Simon Stadler
LICHTER Art Award: Stefanie Böttcher, Sergey Harutoonian, Saul Judd
VR Storytelling Award: Tomislav Bezmalinoviv, Vanessa Kincaid, Eckart Köberich
2019
Regional Short Film: Isabel Gathof, Jonatan Schwenk, Ralph Förg
Regional Feature Film: Birgit Gamke, Jenny Schily, Susanne Heinrich
LICHTER Art Award: Tamara Grcic, Christina Lehnert, Saul Judd
VR Storytelling Award: Benoit Felici The Real Thing
2020
 Regional Short Film: Rolf Silber, Dr. Catherine Colas, Daniel Popat
 Regional Feature Film: Anatol Schuster, Margrit Schreiber-Brunner, Ernst Szebedits
 LICHTER Art Award: Natasha A. Kelly, Gerhard Wissner Ventura, Saul Judd
 VR Storytelling Award: Ioana Matei, Kirsty van der Plas, Susanne Ahmadseresht
2021
 Regional Short Film: Simone Wagner, Dennis Mill, Hannes Kranich
 Regional Feature Film: Anna Böger, Connie Walther, Sebastian Brose
 LICHTER Art Award: Jeremy Shaw, Carina Bukuts, Saul Judd
 VR Storytelling Award: Jimmy Cheng, Rahel Demant, Georgy Molodtsov
2022

 Regional Short Film: Alexandra Gramatke, Karl Eberhard Schäfer, Peter Meister
 Regional Feature Film: Antonia Kilian, Barbara Philipp, Jakob Zimmermann
 LICHTER Art Award: Christin Müller, Gunter Deller, Saul Judd
 VR Storytelling Award: Agata Di Tommaso, Michael Gödde, Mathias Fournier

Venues 
The Lichter Filmfest Frankfurt International plays at several cinemas in Frankfurt and the Rhine-Main region. The following cinemas and locations have been used since 2008:

 Atelierfrankfurt
 Caligari Filmbühne
 Cantate-Saal / Volksbühne im Großen Hirschgraben
 Cinestar Metropolis
 Comoedienhaus Wilhelmsbad
 E-Kinos
 Erster Stock
 filmklubb Offenbach
 Hafenkino Offenbach
 Harmonie Kinos
 Kino im Deutsches Filmmuseum
 Kino im Lederpalast
 Künstlerhaus Mousonturm
 Mal Seh’n Kino
 mmk Vortragssaal
 Murnau-Filmtheater Wiesbaden
 Naxoshalle
 Praunheimer Werkstätten
 Pupille - University Cinema
 Rex-Programmkino
 TOR Art Space
 Turmpalast
 Zoo-Gesellschaftshaus
 Basis e.V.

Key Subjects 
Since 2012, the international program and the accompanying program of the Lichter Filmfest focus on a specific key subject in its lectures, talk show panels, performances and experimental formats of discussion forums. 
2012: Revolutions (Revolutionen)
2013: City (Stadt)
2014: Humor, comicality, and comedy (Humor, Komik und Komödie) 
2015: Money (Geld)
2016: Frontiers (Grenzen)
2017: Truth (Wahrheit)
2018: Chaos (Chaos)
2019: Nature (Natur)
2020: Power (Macht)
2021: Change (Wandel)
2022: Freedom (Freiheit)

Honorary Patrons 
2013: Volker Schlöndorff
2014: Leander Haußmann
2016: Edgar Reitz
2017: Doris Dörrie

References

External links 
 Official Website
 Press Clippings Lichter Filmfest 2012 (PDF; 3,6 MB)

Film festivals in Germany
Culture in Frankfurt
Tourist attractions in Frankfurt